The Crystal Palace Rally was a gathering of Boy Scouts and Girl Scouts at the Crystal Palace in London on Saturday, 4 September 1909. The rally demonstrated the rapid popularization of Scouting with an estimated 11,000 boys attending with the prominent presence of Girl Scouts also being significant for the start of Girl Scouts and Girl Guides. The rally was held a year and a half after the publication of Scouting for Boys and The Scout magazine, and two years after Robert Baden-Powell's demonstration Brownsea Island Scout Camp.

The Rally was a precursor to the later Scout Jamborees and World Scout Jamborees.

Some controversy occurred with attempts to exclude Scouts from  the British Boy Scouts, Church Scout Patrols and other scouts not registered with Baden-Powell's Boy Scouts organization leading to challenges regarding the 4th Scout Law that "A Scout is ... a brother to every other scout".

The concept of the Scouts' Own, a simple, non-denominational religious ceremony, was introduced at the rally by H. Geoffrey Elwes at this rally.

Members of the local Scout Troop, 2nd Croydon (1st Crystal Palace Patrol), formed part of the flag party for Princess Christian, a member of the Royal family in attendance. The Group still meet near Crystal Palace Park and regularly use Crystal Palace park for Scouting activities.

Girls
Several hundred Girl Scouts also attended, including one group under their Patrol Leader Marguerite de Beaumont. They dressed in the Girl Scout uniform as given in the Scout handbook, called themselves Girl Scouts, were referred to as Girl Scouts by the media and others and were registered as Boy Scouts. Girls had been part of the Scout Movement almost as soon as it began. A contingent of girls from Peckham Rye spoke to Baden-Powell at the Rally. The rally was the first time Baden-Powell was able to discern clearly how many girls were interested in Scouting, although he knew there were several thousand.

The media coverage of the rally, including that in "The Spectator" magazine in  October–December  1909 initiated by Miss Violet Markham, led to the founding, in 1910, of the Girl Guides organisation under Baden-Powell's sister, Agnes Baden-Powell that further led to other national Girl Guide and Girl Scout organisations. In December 1909, Baden-Powell decided to create a similar but separate programme for girls. In those days, for girls to camp and hike was not common, as this extract from the Scout newspaper shows: "If a girl is not allowed to run, or even hurry, to swim, ride a bike, or raise her arms above her head, how can she become a Scout?", though it is a curiosity, as in those days many girls and young women belonged to bicycle clubs. Agnes Baden-Powell became the first president of the Girl Guides.

Attendees who later influenced Scouting and Guiding included Nesta G. Ashworth née Maude, later instrumental in the setup of Lone Guides, Rotha Lintorn-Orman and Nella Levy, a pioneer of Guiding in Australia.

To commemorate the event, Girlguiding UK open a Centenary Maze in Crystal Palace Park in September 2009.

See also
Guiding 2010 Centenary

References

Crystal Palace Scout Rally, 1909
Girlguiding
Crystal Palace, London